Krummbach may refer to:

 Krummbach LU, a village in the municipality of Geuensee, canton of Lucerne, Switzerland
 Krummbach (Ablach), a river of Baden-Württemberg, Germany, tributary of the Ablach
 Krummbach (Dreisam), a river of Baden-Württemberg, Germany, tributary of the Dreisam
 Krummbach (Steinhauser Rottum), artificially created stream in Ochsenhausen, Baden-Baden-Württemberg, Germany, tributary of the Steinhauser Rottum

See also
 Krumbach (disambiguation)